AP Capstone (properly the Advanced Placement Capstone Diploma Program) is a 2-year program developed by the College Board, which consists of two courses: the AP Seminar and AP Research. Students who successfully complete the program and obtain scores of 3 or higher on at least four other AP exams receive either an AP Capstone Diploma or an AP Seminar and Research Certificate.

History 

The predecessor to the current AP Capstone program, the AP|Cambridge Capstone Program, was initially offered in 17 high schools worldwide. With the launch of the full AP Capstone by the College Board in fall 2014, the program has expanded to now being offered in 1100 schools. Over 100 colleges and universities support the AP Capstone program.

AP Seminar 

AP Seminar is the foundation course taken in 10th or 11th grade. It provides students the opportunity to develop critical thinking skills and prepare for university. Students explore real-world issues such as innovation, sustainability and technology. The assessment culminates in 2 through-course tasks and a final written exam. The through-course tasks are the following:

 Task 1: An Individual Research Report and a Team Multimedia Presentation
 Task description: Students form a team of two to four students to create a presentation on a specific topic based on their Individual Research Reports. Once team members decide on a topic, each member will research a specific perspective of their team topic. For example, if the team project was the ongoing Opioid epidemic, member might research the economic impact of the epidemic, or the socioeconomic factors fueling the epidemic. This research is compiled into a 1080-1320 word Individual Research Report. Once the research reports are finished, students will return to their teams and combine their research into an eight-ten minute presentation. The presentation is followed by oral defense where each team member responds to one question relating to their presentation from a teacher.
 Task 2: An Individual Written Argument, Individual Multimedia Presentation, and a set of Oral Defense questions.
Task description: Students are provided stimulus material from the Collegeboard to create an 1800-2200 word argumentative essay. This stimulus material is the same for all students taking AP Seminar. The argument cannot be based solely off the stimulus material, outside research and sources are expected. This argument serves as the foundation for the Individual Multimedia Presentation. Students create a presentation that outlines the argument they made in their previous paper. The presentation is expected to last for six-eight minutes. Following this presentation, students are required to their defend their presentation by responding to questions from the teacher grading the presentation.

The final written exam is taken during the two weeks of AP testing in May. (The test costs $142.) Students must receive a score of 3 or higher in the course to continue. The final exam consists of two sections. In the first section, students are given an article selected by the CollegeBoard. Students must evaluate the central claim, line of reasoning, and the evidence of the article. In the second section, students are given four stimulus materials and are expected to create an argumentative essay. Students are allotted two hours for the final exam.

AP Research 

Taken in Grade 11 or 12, students design, plan and conduct a year-long research-based investigation on a personally-chosen subject in AP Research. The assessment culminates with a 5,000-word academic thesis paper, as well as a public presentation. Students must obtain a final score of 3 or higher to be able to receive AP certification.

Starting in the 2017–18 school year, AP Research papers are graded using a holistic rubric. The two central elements that move a paper from a 2 to a 3 are the middle two rows, which assess the methodology and conclusion. The rubric can be seen here.

More specifically, a replicable methodology and a new understanding are required to pass.

Program completion 

 AP Capstone Certificate
 3+ on both AP Seminar and AP Research
 AP Capstone Diploma
 3+ on both AP Seminar and AP Research
 3+ on 4 additional AP exams of student choice

References 

 
2014 establishments in the United States
Canadian educational programs
United States educational programs
Gifted education
High school course levels